Deepcut is a military village in England.

Deepcut or Deep Cut may also refer to:

 Deepcut Barracks, the Princess Royal Barracks, Deepcut
 Deep Cut (play), 2008 play by Philip Ralph
 Deep Cut (band), a British rock band
 Operation Deep Cut, a raid by British Commandos during the Second World War
 Deep Cut, a fictional pop trio in Splatoon 3

See also
 Deep Cuts (disambiguation)